Deulajhari, the ancient citadel of Shaivism, is located in Deulajhari village in the Angul district of Odisha. This attractive place is having  and 55 decimals of land and covered with indigenous- pandanus forest. It is known for a hot spring and a very old ancient Shiva Shree Siddeswar Baba temple. There are 24 hot springs around the temple although temple records say that once there were 84 such hot water springs.

Gallery

References

External links
 Deulajhari Hot Spring, Anugul

Hot springs of Odisha
Tourist attractions in Odisha
Angul district
Shiva temples in Odisha